Lambert Micha (born 15 February 1950) is a Belgian sprinter. He competed in the men's 100 metres at the 1976 Summer Olympics.

References

External links
 

1950 births
Living people
Athletes (track and field) at the 1976 Summer Olympics
Belgian male sprinters
Olympic athletes of Belgium
People from Remicourt, Belgium
Sportspeople from Liège Province